Flesh is the second studio album by David Gray. It was initially released on 6 September 1994, and re-released in 2001. The cover was changed to a black and white photo for the re-release.

Critical reception
Trouser Press wrote that the musicians are led "into semi-electric ladyland on Flesh, using grander arrangements that, thanks to an excess of extroversion in the overall effort, turn the Gaelic aspect of Gray’s music dismayingly toward the Waterboys ... a disappointment."

Track listing

Credits

Musicians
 David Gray – vocals, guitar
 Neil MacColl – backing vocals (track 5), guitar (tracks 1, 2, 3, 5, 8, 9 & 10), mandolin (tracks 2 & 9), autoharp (track 3), slide guitar (track 6), hi-strung guitar (track 8), Danelectro guitar (track 10)
 David Nolte – bass
 Seamus Beaghen – piano
 Andy Metcalfe – organ, piano
 Craig McClune – drums, percussion (1, 2 & 10)
 Roy Dodds – drums, percussion (tracks 3, 5, 6, 8 & 9) 
 Simon Edwards – acoustic bass

Production
 Recorded by Jim Abbiss; except tracks 3, 6, 9, and 10 recorded by Jim Abbiss and Jock Loveland, and track 7 recorded by David Gray.
 Mixed by Neil MacColl, Jim Abbiss, and David Gray.
 Photography by John Ross, Lawrence Watson, Richard J. Burbridge, and Thomas Krygier.

References

David Gray (musician) albums
1994 albums
Virgin Records albums